Mount Nesselrode, also known as Boundary Peak 98, is a  peak in the Boundary Ranges of the Coast Mountains, located on and in part defining the border between British Columbia, Canada, and Alaska, United States.

It was named in 1924 on the 100th anniversary of the Russo-American Treaty of 1824 in honour of Karl Nesselrode, also known as Charles de Nesselrode, then Russian Minister of Foreign Affairs and a plenipotentiary in the negotiations that produced the Russo-American Treaty of 1824 and defined the boundary between Russian America and US claims to the Oregon Country and was mirrored in a parallel Russian treaty with the British the next year, defining 54°40′ north as the southward limit of Russian possessions.

The first ascent of Mount Nesselrode was made in August 1973.

References

Nesselrode, Mount
Nesselrode, Mount
Mountains of Haines Borough, Alaska
Mountains of Juneau, Alaska
Nesselrode, Mount
Nesselrode, Mount
Canada–United States border
International mountains of North America